Ghanpur is a Mandal in Wanaparthy district, Telangana. It is also known as Khilla Ghanpur.It was a part of Mahbubnagar district earlier to the formation of new districts in Telangana.

Mandal Parishath

ZPTC member

Institutions
 Zilla Parishad (Boys) High School
 Zilla Parishad (girls ) High School
 Ravindra Vidyanikethan
 Kasturba Gandhi Balika Vidyalaya
 Govt. Junior College
 Goutham concept school
 T S model school (Donthikunta Thanda)

Villages
The villages in Ghanpur mandal include:
 Agaram 	
 Almaipally 	
 Anthaipally 	
 Appareddipally 	
 Ghanpur 	
 Jangamaipally 	
 Kamaluddinpur 	
 Malkapur
 Mamidimada 	
 Manajipet 	
 Md.hussainpally 	
 Parvathapur 	
 Rukkannapally 	
 Salkalapur 	
 Shapur 	
 Solipur
 Thirumalaipally 	
 Upperpally 	
 Venkatampally

History

This place was named after Kakatiya king Ganapathi Deva in 13th Century as Ganapuram, eventually it is spelled as Ghanpur. Since it has a Khilla, Telugu for fort, it popularly known as Khilla Ghanpur. Prior to the construction of the fort and naming this village as Ganapuram, there was a small village present with name Naginenepalli in 13th Century.

References

Mandals in Wanaparthy district